Sabeluzole (R-58,735) is a nootropic and neuroprotective drug which was originally developed for the treatment of Alzheimer's disease, and has subsequently been researched for other applications such as sleep apnoea. It acts primarily as an NMDA antagonist, but other mechanisms of action may also be important.

See also 
 Memantine

References 

NMDA receptor antagonists
Fluoroarenes
Phenol ethers
Secondary alcohols
Piperidines
Benzothiazoles